William Charles Retford (1875–1970) and William R. Retford (1899–1960) were English musical instrument bow-makers, working for the firm of W.E. Hill & Sons. Retford is recognized as developing the Hill bow, along with Alfred Hill.

William C. Retford was a perfectionist who became known as the best bow craftsman of his time. 
He created (and was first to use) the fleur-de-lis design on the best quality gold and tortoiseshell bows. In 1964, William C. Retford wrote "Bows and Bowmakers", which offered a new perspective regarding English bows.

William Richard  Retford (1899–1960) trained as a bow maker with his father. Unfortunately William Richard found it difficult to live up to his father's fame. Although he was employed by the Hills, he mainly worked on rehairing bows.,

After the death of William C. Retford, his colleagues Mr. Porter and Mr. Yeoman arranged with William R Retford's daughter that all his tools and other material should be donated to the Bate Collection of Musical Instruments in Oxford in his memory. In addition, they and Arthur Bultitude established the nucleus of the Retford Memorial Collection of Bows. The collection includes viol and viola d'amore bows by Edward Dodd.

Notes

References
 Bows and Bow-Makers, by William C. Retford, First edition. London: The Strad (1964). Second edition, Sevenoaks: Novello & Company Ltd., (1972)
 The Retford Centenary Exhibition, by Malcolm Sadler, Arthur Bultitude and others, London, Ealing Strings. 1975
Profile at Hill Bows
W.E. Hill & Sons (A Tribute)- Richard Sadler 1996

External links 
 The Hill Bow
 Pegturning tales (from The Strad)
 William Charles Retford Published in Hampshire Magazine; Vol. 20 No. 3 January 1980

Bow makers
English musical instrument makers